Anders Eriksson may refer to:
Anders Eriksson (comedian) (born 1956), Swedish comedian and actor
Anders Eriksson (Norrköping curler) (born 1956), Swedish curler from Norrköping
Anders Eriksson (Karlstad curler) (born 1982), Swedish curler from Karlstad
Anders Eriksson (footballer) (born 1965), Finnish footballer
Anders Eriksson (ice hockey, born 1975), Swedish professional ice hockey player
Anders Eriksson (ice hockey, born 1985), Swedish professional ice hockey player
Anders Eriksson (enduro rider) (born 1973), Swedish enduro rider
Anders Eriksson Hästehufvud (1577–1657), Swedish officer and governor

See also
K. Anders Ericsson, Swedish psychologist professor
Eriksson (surname)